Jakob Bergman (born 2 January 1996) is a Swedish football defender who plays for Umeå FC. He has been capped as a Sweden youth international.

References

1996 births
Living people
Swedish footballers
Association football defenders
Sweden youth international footballers
IFK Göteborg players
IK Sirius Fotboll players
Nyköpings BIS players
Varbergs BoIS players
Umeå FC players
Ettan Fotboll players
Superettan players
Allsvenskan players
Footballers from Uppsala